Calkiní (Yucatec Maya: "throat of the sun") is one of the 11 municipalities in the Mexican state of Campeche. It is situated at the northern tip of the state, on the central western coast the Yucatán Peninsula. The municipal seat, and largest settlement, is the city of Calkiní.

History and geography
The municipality of Calkiní borders to the west with the Gulf of Mexico; to the north and east with the state of Yucatán; and to the south with the municipality of Hecelchakán. 
It covers 1,966.57 km².

Demographics
The 2010 census reported a population of 52,890 persons. Of these, 26,127 spoke one of several indigenous languages, predominantly Yucatec Maya.

As of 2010, the city of Calkiní had a population of 14,934. Other than the city of Calkiní, the municipality had 202 localities, the largest of which (with 2010 populations in parentheses) were: Dzitbalché (11,686), Bécal (6,511), Nunkiní (5,859), Bacabchén (2,527), classified as urban, and Santa Cruz Pueblo (1,908), Tepakán (1,895), San Antonio Sahcabchén (1,858), Santa Cruz Ex-Hacienda (1,255), and Tankuché (1,006), classified as rural.

Heritage
The Maya archaeological site of Can-Mayab-Mul is in Nunkiní.

References

Link to tables of population data from Census of 2005 INEGI: Instituto Nacional de Estadística, Geografía e Informática
Calkiní Enciclopedia de los Municipios de México

External links
Ayuntamiento de Calkiní Official website 
Municipio de Calkiní from official Campeche state government website 

Municipalities of Campeche